Mary Louise Cowan ( Shillingburg; December 22, 1916 – November 16, 2015) was an American critic and teacher, and wife of the physicist and University of Dallas president Donald Cowan (author of Unbinding Prometheus). She taught at Texas Christian University and Thomas More College of Liberal Arts. Cowan lived in Dallas, where she taught at both at the University of Dallas and the Dallas Institute of Humanities and Culture. She was a prominent figure in Dallas society as a mentor and friend to many Dallas dignitaries and as one of the city's leading intellectuals.

Cowan was vastly influential in the fostering of the liberal arts, helping shape core curricula for several liberal arts universities.  In studies of the American South, she was an influential critic of Faulkner, the Fugitive Group, and other Southern writers.  A doctoral student of Donald Davidson at Vanderbilt University, she became a friend to members of the Southern Agrarians, and was considered to be the critical heir to their legacy. Her criticism has influenced many who continue to write about the South.  In 1991, she was a recipient of the Frankel Prize. In 2010, she was named on a list of the twenty most brilliant living Christian professors. She died November 16, 2015, of natural causes at the age of 98.

Books
 The Fugitive Group: A Literary History (1959)
 The Southern Critics: An Introduction to the Criticism of John Crowe Ransom, Allen Tate, Donald Davidson, Robert Penn Warren, Cleanth Brooks, and Andrew Lytle (1971)
 The Terrain of Comedy (edited and introduced) (1983)
 Classic Texts and the Nature of Authority: An Account of a Principals' Institute Conducted by the Dallas Institute of Humanities and Culture (edited with Donald Cowan, with essays and commentary) (1993)
 Invitation to the Classics (edited with Os Guinness) (1998)

References

External links
 Louise Cowan's page at the University of Dallas website
 "The Prime of Louise Cowan" in D Magazine
 Interview with Louise Cowan

1916 births
2015 deaths
National Humanities Medal recipients
Texas Christian University faculty
Thomas More College of Liberal Arts
University of Dallas faculty
Vanderbilt University alumni